Eyes Upon Separation was a hardcore punk band from Ohio that formed in 1998. In 2001, guitarist Matt Auxier briefly played in the metalcore band Zao. Bassist JT Woodruff formed the alternative rock band Hawthorne Heights, Second Drummer, Jeff Lohrber joined hardcore band, Suffocate Faster as well as Today Is the Day, and is currently in Harlot. Other members (who the 'other members' are is still unknown) formed the black metal/metalcore band Surcease.

Discography
EPs
 The Leaves Fall With Grace, The Leaves Fall With Sadness (2000; Tribunal)

Studio albums
 I Hope She's Having Nightmares (2002; Uprising)

Members
Last known line-up
 Brandon Smith - vocals (1998-2002)
 Matt Auxier - guitar (1998-2002)
 Nick Corns - guitar (1998-2002)
 JT Woodruff - bass (1998-2002)
 Jeff Lohrber - drums (2002)
Former
 Jeremey Rankin - drums (1998-2002)
  Eric Wilt - guitar (1998)
 Timeline

References

Musical groups from Ohio
Musical groups established in 1998
Musical groups disestablished in 2002
1998 establishments in Ohio
2002 disestablishments in Ohio